Wayne Coffey may refer to:

 Wayne Coffey (journalist), author and journalist who co-wrote a biography for R. A. Dickey
 Wayne Coffey (American football), former American football wide receiver